An ancillary statistic is a measure of a sample whose distribution (or whose pmf or pdf) does not depend on the parameters of the model. An ancillary statistic is a pivotal quantity that is also a statistic. Ancillary statistics can be used to construct prediction intervals.

This concept was introduced by Ronald Fisher in the 1920s.

Examples

Suppose X1, ..., Xn are independent and identically distributed, and are normally distributed with unknown expected value μ and known variance 1.  Let

be the sample mean.

The following statistical measures of dispersion of the sample
Range: max(X1, ..., Xn) − min(X1, ..., Xn)
Interquartile range: Q3 − Q1
Sample variance:
 
are all ancillary statistics, because their sampling distributions do not change as μ changes. Computationally, this is because in the formulas, the μ terms cancel – adding a constant number to a distribution (and all samples) changes its sample maximum and minimum by the same amount, so it does not change their difference, and likewise for others: these measures of dispersion do not depend on location.

Conversely, given i.i.d. normal variables with known mean 1 and unknown variance σ2, the sample mean  is not an ancillary statistic of the variance, as the sampling distribution of the sample mean is N(1, σ2/n), which does depend on σ 2 – this measure of location (specifically, its standard error) depends on dispersion.

In location-scale families 
In a location family of distributions,  is an ancillary statistic.

In a scale family of distributions,  is an ancillary statistic.

In a location-scale family of distributions, where  is the sample variance, is an ancillary statistic.

In recovery of information 
This is known as conditional inference.

For example, suppose that  follow the  distribution where  is unknown.

Ancillary complement
Given a statistic T that is not sufficient, an ancillary complement is a statistic U that is ancillary and such that (T, U) is sufficient. Intuitively, an ancillary complement "adds the missing information" (without duplicating any).

The statistic is particularly useful if one takes T to be a maximum likelihood estimator, which in general will not be sufficient; then one can ask for an ancillary complement. In this case, Fisher argues that one must condition on an ancillary complement to determine information content: one should consider the Fisher information content of T to not be the marginal of T, but the conditional distribution of T, given U: how much information does T add? This is not possible in general, as no ancillary complement need exist, and if one exists, it need not be unique, nor does a maximum ancillary complement exist.

Example
In baseball, suppose a scout observes a batter in N at-bats.  Suppose (unrealistically) that the number N is chosen by some random process that is independent of the batter's ability – say a coin is tossed after each at-bat and the result determines whether the scout will stay to watch the batter's next at-bat.  The eventual data are the number N of at-bats and the number X of hits: the data (X, N) are a sufficient statistic.   The observed batting average X/N fails to convey all of the information available in the data because it fails to report the number N of at-bats (e.g., a batting average of 0.400, which is very high, based on only five at-bats does not inspire anywhere near as much confidence in the player's ability than a 0.400 average based on 100 at-bats).  The number N of at-bats is an ancillary statistic because
 It is a part of the observable data (it is a statistic), and
 Its probability distribution does not depend on the batter's ability, since it was chosen by a random process independent of the batter's ability.
This ancillary statistic is an ancillary complement to the observed batting average X/N, i.e., the batting average X/N is not a sufficient statistic, in that it conveys less than all of the relevant information in the data, but conjoined with N, it becomes sufficient.

See also

 Basu's theorem
 Prediction interval
 Group family
 Conditionality principle

Notes

Statistical theory